Downieville-Lawson-Dumont is a census-designated place (CDP) comprising the unincorporated communities of Downieville, Lawson, and Dumont located in and governed by Clear Creek County, Colorado, United States. The CDP is a part of the Denver–Aurora–Lakewood, CO Metropolitan Statistical Area. The Dumont post office ZIP code 80436 (post office boxes) serves the area. At the United States Census 2020, the population of the Downieville-Lawson-Dumont CDP was 527.

Geography
Downieville, Lawson, and Dumont are adjacent in Clear Creek Canyon alongside Interstate 70.

Demographics
 

See also

Outline of Colorado
Index of Colorado-related articles
State of Colorado
Colorado cities and towns
Colorado census-designated places
Colorado counties
Clear Creek County, Colorado
List of statistical areas in Colorado
Front Range Urban Corridor
North Central Colorado Urban Area
Denver-Aurora-Boulder, CO Combined Statistical Area
Denver-Aurora-Broomfield, CO Metropolitan Statistical Area

References

External links

Downieville @ UncoverColorado.com 
Downieville @ Clear Creek County Tourism Bureau
Lawson Adventure Park & Resort
Dumont @ Colorado.com
Dumont @ UncoverColorado.com
Dumont @ Clear Creek County Tourism Bureau
Dumont, Colorado Mining Claims And Mines
Clear Creek County website

Census-designated places in Clear Creek County, Colorado
Census-designated places in Colorado
Denver metropolitan area